Jhang-Chiniot road (or Chiniot-Jhang road) is a highway Grand Trunk Road road in Punjab, Pakistan. It starts from Jhang and leads to the Chiniot with the 81 km length.

Companies 
Companies based along the road:
 Ramzan Sugar Mills, Bhawana

Education 
Educational institutions located on the road are:
 Chenab College, Chiniot (3 km besides the road)
 Chenab College, Jhang
 University of Veterinary and Animal Sciences Jhang Campus
 Ghazali Inter College, Bhawana
 Govt. High School Rashida, Rashida (10 km from Chiniot )

Populated places 
Cities, towns and villages situated by this road are:
 Bhawana (major city)
 Chiniot (major city)
 Jamia Abad
 Jhang (major city)
 Kheiwa
 Rashida (Village)

References 

Highways in Punjab
Roads in Punjab, Pakistan